Iron(II) fumarate, also known as ferrous fumarate, is the iron(II) salt of fumaric acid, occurring as a reddish-orange powder, used to supplement iron intake. It has the chemical formula . Pure ferrous fumarate has an iron content of 32.87%, therefore one tablet of 300 mg iron fumarate will contain 98.6 mg of iron (548% Daily Value based on 18 mg RDI).

Iron supplement
Ferrous fumarate is often taken orally as an iron supplement to treat or prevent iron deficiency anaemia.

See also
 Iron - Nutrition

References

Iron(II) compounds
Dietary minerals
Coordination complexes
Fumarates
Antianemic preparations